Gareth MacHale (born 12 August 1980) is an Irish rally driver, who has scored points in the World Rally Championship.

Career
MacHale comes from a family with a background in rallying. His father Austin MacHale is a five-time Irish Tarmac Rally Championship champion. Gareth's younger brother Aaron is also a rally driver.

MacHale competed in an eight-round programme in the 2006 World Rally Championship season in a privately entered Ford Focus WRC. He finished sixth on Rally Mexico, scoring three world championship points. In 2007 he competed in five WRC events, finishing eighth on his home round Rally Ireland, which was being run as a WRC event for the first time. He competed in Rally Ireland again in 2009, but retired.

In 2008 MacHale competed in the Race of Champions.

In 2010 he followed in his father's footsteps by winning the Irish Tarmac Rally Championship for the first time.

WRC results

References

Living people
1980 births
Irish rally drivers
World Rally Championship drivers